Ardito was a destroyer built for the Italian  (Royal Navy) in the 1910s.

Design

They had a crew of 4 officers and 65 enlisted men. The ships were powered by two Parsons steam turbines, with steam provided by four Thornycroft water-tube boilers.

The ship carried an armament that consisted of a single  gun and four  guns, along with two  torpedo tubes. The 102 mm gun was placed on the forecastle and the two of the 76 mm guns were mounted abreast the funnels, with the remaining pair at the stern. The torpedo tubes were in single mounts, both on the centerline.

Service history
Ardito was built at the  shipyard in Livorno, and was launched on 20 October 1912.

After the end of the war, the ship had her armament revised to five  35-cal. guns, a single  35-cal. gun, and a pair of  machine guns. The work was completed by 1920. The ship was reclassified as a torpedo boat on 1 October 1929, though she did not remain on active service for long afterward. On 2 October 1931, Ardito was struck from the naval register and subsequently discarded.

Notes

References
 

Ardito-class destroyers
1912 ships